The Unusual Suspects is an Australian comedy-drama television series screened on SBS TV from 3 June 2021. The four-part miniseries is directed by Natalie Bailey and Melvin Montalban and produced by Angie Fielder and Polly Staniford. It is written by Jessica Redenbach, Roger Monk and Vonne Patiag, with Margarett Cortez as script consultant. The series is primarily in English, with some parts in Tagalog.

Synopsis
A multi-million-dollar necklace is stolen from the home of self-made Filipina businesswoman Roxanne Waters during her twins' extravagant birthday party in Sydney's glamorous Eastern Suburbs. The ensuing police investigation threatens to expose cracks in Vaucluse's sparkling façade, shedding a light on hidden rivalries, shady business deals and forbidden affairs. Everyone is under suspicion, from social darling Sara Beasley, whose perfect life is crumbling fast, to her long-suffering nanny, Evie De La Rosa, a godmother of sorts for other Filipino domestic workers.

Cast
 Miranda Otto as Sara Beasley
 Aina Dumlao as Evie De La Rosa
 Michelle Vergara Moore as Roxanne Waters
 Peter O'Brien as Nick Parker-Smith
 Matt Day as Garth Beasley
 Toby Leonard Moore as Jordan Waters
 Lena Cruz as Amy
 Susana Downes as Gigi
 Ari Boyland as Dean
 Heather Mitchell as Birdie
 James Lugton as Detective Andrew Moran
 Renee Lim as Detective Claudia Lin
 Susie Porter as Rae
 Sandy Gore as Jeannie
 Megan Smart as Paloma
 Andrea Demetriades as Martha Drewe
 Blake Santos as Joshua Waters
 Avery Santos as Rory Waters
 Darcey O’Brien as Charlie
 Emma Cleland as Maxi Beasley
 Liam Cleland as Ollie Beasley
 Miguel Castro as Modesto
 Danielle David as Melanie

Episodes

External links

Aquarius Films – production website

References

2021 Australian television series debuts
English-language television shows
Special Broadcasting Service original programming